Nana Agyemang Badu I Stadium is a football stadium in Dormaa Ahenkro, Ghana.  It is currently used mostly for football matches, on club level by Aduana Stars of the Ghana Premier League. The stadium has a capacity of 10,000 spectators. It also hosted Aduana stars in their champions league match against al Tahadi of Libya. It also hosted it first ever car confederation cup match between aduana stars and raja Casablanca

References

Football venues in Ghana
Aduana Stars F.C.